Saint Croix is a civil parish in Charlotte County, New Brunswick, Canada, straddling Route 1 to the north of Saint Andrews, New Brunswick. It comprises two local service districts, both of which are members of the Southwest New Brunswick Service Commission (SNBSC).

The Census subdivision of the same name includes the entire parish, while the LSD of Bayside is used as a Designated place.

Origin of name
The parish's name comes from the St. Croix River, which forms part of its western border.

History
Saint Croix was erected in 1874 from the northern part of Saint Andrews Parish, including parts of Saint Andrews, Saint David, and Saint Patrick Parishes but lacking the northeastern part of modern Saint Croix.

Boundaries
Saint Croix is bounded:

 on the east and south by a highly irregular line beginning about 350 metres northwesterly of the junction of Wilson Road and Route 127, then running southeasterly past Route 127 to the northwestern line of a grant to James McFarlane, then running generally southerly along the rear lines of tiers of grants along Cathcart Road, Route 760, Giles Road, Armstrongs Mill Road, Goldsmiths Stream, Eastman Lake, Bonaparte Lake, Welch Lake, and Gibson Lake to the southeastern corner of a grant to James Greenlaw, then westerly to Little Chamcook Lake, then southerly along Little Chamcook Lake and the brook to Chamcook Lake, then clockwise around Chamcook Lake to a point west of the southern end of Odell Island, then southwesterly to the rear line of grants along the St. Croix River, then southeasterly about 2.5 kilometres to a point near Edwards Corner, then southwesterly along the southeastern line of a grant to Daniel Grant to the St. Croix;
 on the west by the St. Croix River, Oak Bay, and the Waweig River to Route 170, then northerly along the rear line of Oak Bay grants just past Route 760, then easterly along the northern line of a grant to William H. Mowat, then northerly along the rear line of grants to a point about 1 kilometres past Board Road, then easterly and northeasterly along grant lines to the starting point;
 including Rickets Island.

Evolution of boundaries
Saint Croix originally included five grants in Oak Bay that are now in Saint David Parish, parts of Saint Andrews Parish west of the railway and north of Wilsons Corner, and a strip of land in southwestern Saint Patrick Parish; Giles Road, Cathcart Road, the eastern end of Armstrong Mill Road, and a few small areas along the eastern edge remained part of Saint Patrick.

In 1881 the Oak Bay lots were transferred to Saint David and the northeastern part of modern Saint Croix was taken from Saint Patrick.

In 1896 Ricketts Island and St. Croix Island were explicitly placed in Saint Croix Parish, though St. Croix Island had been part of Maine for nearly a century; the St. Croix Island error was corrected in 1899. The boundary with Saint Patrick was moved west along nearly half its length in the south.

In 1958 the modern parish boundaries were set, losing land between the railway and the Chamcook Lakes system as well as a triangle north of Wileys Corner to Saint Andrews, gaining a triangular piece of Dumbarton Parish on the northern edge, and gaining several bits of Saint Patrick by changing the eastern boundary to run entirely along grant lines and natural features.

Local service districts
Both LSDs assess for the basic LSD services of fire protection, police services, land use planning, emergency measures, and dog control.

Saint Croix Parish
The local service district of the parish of Saint Croix originally comprised the entire parish.

The LSD was established in 1970 to assess for fire protection. First aid and ambulance services were added in 1975.

Today the LSD assesses for only basic services. The taxing authority is 514.00 Saint Croix.

Bayside
Bayside comprises all of the parish mainland south of Route 1.

Bayside was established in 1985 to add community services.

Today the LSD additionally assesses for community & recreation services. The taxing authority is 527.00 Bayside.

Communities
Communities at least partly within the parish. italics indicate a name no longer in official use

 Bartletts Mills
 Bayside (Lower Bayside, Upper Bayside)
 Edwards Corner
 Gilmans Corner

 Roix Road
 Waweig
 Wileys Corner

Bodies of water
Bodies of water at least partly within the parish. italics indicate a name no longer in official use

 St. Croix River
 Waweig River
 Chamcook Stream
 Goldsmiths Stream

 Chamcook Lake
 Little Chamcook Lake (Second Chamcook Lake)
 more than a dozen other officially named lakes

Islands
Islands at least partly within the parish.
 Big Rock (in Chamcook Lake)
 Odell Island (in Chamcook Lake)
 Rickets Island (in Waweig River)

Census data

Population

Language

See also
List of parishes in New Brunswick

Notes

References

Parishes of Charlotte County, New Brunswick